Samuel Kyere (born 6 August 1992) is a Ghanaian football (defender) player whose last known club was Asante Kotoko.

Career statistics

Club

References 

 
 

1992 births
Living people
Ghanaian footballers
Association football defenders
Berekum Chelsea F.C. players
FC Shirak players
Armenian Premier League players
Ghanaian expatriate footballers
Expatriate footballers in Armenia